Tue Hellstem (born 10 February 1961) is a Danish modern pentathlete. He competed at the 1988 Summer Olympics.

References

External links
 

1961 births
Living people
Danish male modern pentathletes
Olympic modern pentathletes of Denmark
Modern pentathletes at the 1988 Summer Olympics
People from Helsingør
Sportspeople from the Capital Region of Denmark